Lorenzo Roverella (died 1474) was a Roman Catholic prelate who served as Bishop of Ferrara (1460–1474).

Biography
On 26 March 1460, Lorenzo Roverella was appointed during the papacy of Pope Pius II as Bishop of Ferrara.
He served as Bishop of Ferrara until his death in 1474.

While bishop, he was the principal co-consecrator of Giovanni Stefano Botticelli, Bishop of Cremona.

Rovarella was a referendary in the Roman Curia when Pope Paul II named him to proclaim an indulgence for the crusade against the  Hussite king of Bohemia, George Podiebrad in 1468.

References

External links and additional sources
 (for Chronology of Bishops) 
 (for Chronology of Bishops) 

15th-century Italian Roman Catholic bishops
Bishops appointed by Pope Pius II
1474 deaths